During the 1996–97 English football season, Blackburn Rovers F.C. competed in the FA Premier League (known as the FA Carling Premiership for sponsorship reasons).

Season summary
An early exit from the League Cup at the hands of Division Two side Stockport County was the final straw for manager Ray Harford, who stepped down on 25 October with Rovers also bottom of the Premiership with no wins from their opening 11 games. 18 months earlier, they had been league champions. Long-serving coach Tony Parkes was appointed caretaker, remaining in the post until the end of the season, when he handed over the reins to Roy Hodgson after Sampdoria's Sven-Göran Eriksson lied about accepting the manager's job and joined Lazio instead. Parkes steered Blackburn to safety as they finished 13th.

The world record £15 million sale of striker Alan Shearer to Newcastle United was seen as the biggest factor in Blackburn's lowest top flight finish since they returned to the elite in 1992. However, his strike-partner Chris Sutton helped keep the club alive after recovering from a drastic loss of form triggered by a spate of injuries the previous season. The acquisition of Swedish striker Martin Dahlin at the end of the season enhanced Blackburn's attack and gave fans hope for a higher finish next time round.

Final league table

Results summary

Results by round

Results
Blackburn Rovers' score comes first

Legend

FA Premier League

FA Cup

League Cup

Squad
Squad at end of season

Reserve squad

Transfers

In

 July 1996: George Donis - Panathinaikos, free
 February 1997: Per Pedersen - Odense, £2,500,000

Out
 Alan Shearer - Newcastle United, £15,000,000

References

Blackburn Rovers F.C. seasons
Blackburn Rovers